The 1941 Louisville Cardinals football team was an American football team that represented the University of Louisville as a member of the Southern Intercollegiate Athletic Association (SIAA) during the 1941 college football season. In their sixth season under head coach Laurie Apitz, the Cardinals compiled a 4–4 record and outscored opponents by a combined total of 143 to 140.

Schedule

References

Louisville
Louisville Cardinals football seasons
Louisville Cardinals football